John Ferrell may refer to:

 John H. Ferrell (1829–1900), Union Navy civilian employee and Medal of Honor recipient
 John Ferrell (darts player) (born 1961), English darts player 
 Will Ferrell (John William Ferrell, born 1967), American actor and comedian

See also
 John Farrell (disambiguation)